This is a list of the birds species of the Tuamotus. The avifauna of the Tuamotus include 86 species. Of these, 13 are endemic, and one is extinct.

This list's taxonomic treatment (designation and sequence of orders, families and species) and nomenclature (common and scientific names) follow the conventions of The Clements Checklist of Birds of the World, 2022 edition. The family accounts at the beginning of each heading reflect this taxonomy, as do the species counts found in each family account. Introduced and accidental species are included in the total counts for the Tuamotus.

The following tags have been used to highlight several categories. The commonly occurring native species do not fall into any of these categories.

 (A) Accidental - a species that rarely or accidentally occurs in the Tuamotus
 (E) Endemic - a species endemic to the Tuamotus
 (I) Introduced - a species introduced to the Tuamotus as a consequence, direct or indirect, of human actions

Ducks, geese, and waterfowl
Order: AnseriformesFamily: Anatidae

Anatidae includes the ducks and most duck-like waterfowl, such as geese and swans. These birds are adapted to an aquatic existence with webbed feet, flattened bills, and feathers that are excellent at shedding water due to an oily coating.

 Northern shoveler, Spatula clypeata (A)

Pheasants, grouse, and allies
Order: GalliformesFamily: Phasianidae

The Phasianidae are a family of terrestrial birds which consists of quails, partridges, snowcocks, francolins, spurfowls, tragopans, monals, pheasants, peafowls and jungle fowls. In general, they are plump (although they vary in size) and have broad, relatively short wings.

Red junglefowl, Gallus gallus

Pigeons and doves
Order: ColumbiformesFamily: Columbidae

Pigeons and doves are stout-bodied birds with short necks and short slender bills with a fleshy cere.

 Rock pigeon, Columba livia
 Polynesian ground dove, Gallicolumba erythroptera (E) 
 Zebra dove, Geopelia striata (I) 
 Makatea fruit-dove, Ptilinopus chalcurus (E) 
 Atoll fruit-dove, Ptilinopus coralensis (E) 
 Red-moustached fruit-dove, Ptilinopus mercierii - extinct
 Pacific imperial-pigeon, Ducula pacifica
 Polynesian imperial-pigeon, Ducula aurorae

Cuckoos
Order: CuculiformesFamily: Cuculidae

The family Cuculidae includes cuckoos, roadrunners and anis. These birds are of variable size with slender bodies, long tails and strong legs. The Old World cuckoos are brood parasites.

Long-tailed koel, Eudynamys taitensis

Rails, gallinules, and coots
Order: GruiformesFamily: Rallidae

Rallidae is a large family of small to medium-sized birds which includes the rails, crakes, coots and gallinules. Typically they inhabit dense vegetation in damp environments near lakes, swamps or rivers. In general they are shy and secretive birds, making them difficult to observe. Most species have strong legs and long toes which are well adapted to soft uneven surfaces. They tend to have short, rounded wings and to be weak fliers.

 Tahiti rail, Gallirallus pacificus- (E), extinct
 Spotless crake, Zapornia tabuensis

Plovers and lapwings
Order: CharadriiformesFamily: Charadriidae

The family Charadriidae includes the plovers, dotterels and lapwings. They are small to medium-sized birds with compact bodies, short, thick necks and long, usually pointed, wings. They are found in open country worldwide, mostly in habitats near water.

 Pacific golden-plover, Pluvialis fulva
 Masked lapwing, Vanellus miles (A)

Sandpipers and allies
Order: CharadriiformesFamily: Scolopacidae

Scolopacidae is a large diverse family of small to medium-sized shorebirds including the sandpipers, curlews, godwits, shanks, tattlers, woodcocks, snipes, dowitchers and phalaropes. The majority of these species eat small invertebrates picked out of the mud or soil. Variation in length of legs and bills enables multiple species to feed in the same habitat, particularly on the coast, without direct competition for food.

 Bristle-thighed curlew, Numenius tahitiensis 
 Ruddy turnstone, Arenaria interpres (A)
 Tuamotu sandpiper, Prosobonia parvirostris (E)
 Sanderling, Calidris alba (A)
 Pectoral sandpiper, Calidris melanotos (A)
 Gray-tailed tattler, Tringa brevipes
 Wandering tattler, Tringa incana
 Lesser yellowlegs, Tringa  flavipes (A)

Skuas and jaegers
Order: CharadriiformesFamily: Stercorariidae

The family Stercorariidae are, in general, medium to large birds, typically with grey or brown plumage, often with white markings on the wings. They nest on the ground in temperate and arctic regions and are long-distance migrants.

Pomarine jaeger, Stercorarius pomarinus

Gulls, terns, and skimmers
Order: CharadriiformesFamily: Laridae

Laridae is a family of medium to large seabirds, the gulls, terns, and skimmers. Gulls are typically grey or white, often with black markings on the head or wings. They have stout, longish bills and webbed feet. Terns are a group of generally medium to large seabirds typically with grey or white plumage, often with black markings on the head. Most terns hunt fish by diving but some pick insects off the surface of fresh water. Terns are generally long-lived birds, with several species known to live in excess of 30 years.

 Brown noddy, Anous stolidus
 Black noddy, Anous minutus
 Blue-gray noddy, Anous cerulea
 White tern, Gygis alba
 Sooty tern, Onychoprion fuscatus
 Gray-backed tern, Onychoprion lunatus
 Bridled tern, Onychoprion anaethetus (A)
 Roseate tern, Sterna dougallii
 Great crested tern, Sterna bergii

Tropicbirds
Order: PhaethontiformesFamily: Phaethontidae

Tropicbirds are slender white birds of tropical oceans, with exceptionally long central tail feathers. Their heads and long wings have black markings.

White-tailed tropicbird, Phaethon lepturus
Red-billed tropicbird, Phaethon aethereus (A)
Red-tailed tropicbird, Phaethon rubricauda

Albatrosses
Order: ProcellariiformesFamily: Diomedeidae

The albatrosses are among the largest of flying birds, and the great albatrosses from the genus Diomedea have the largest wingspans of any extant birds.

 Black-browed albatross, Thalassarche melanophris (A)
 Royal albatross, Diomedea epomophora (A)

Southern storm-petrels
Order: ProcellariiformesFamily: Oceanitidae

The southern storm-petrels are relatives of the petrels and are the smallest seabirds. They feed on planktonic crustaceans and small fish picked from the surface, typically while hovering. The flight is fluttering and sometimes bat-like.

White-faced storm-petrel, Pelagodroma marina 
White-bellied storm-petrel, Fregetta grallaria
Polynesian storm-petrel, Nesofregetta fuliginosa

Shearwaters and petrels
Order: ProcellariiformesFamily: Procellariidae

The procellariids are the main group of medium-sized "true petrels", characterised by united nostrils with medium septum and a long outer functional primary.

 Southern giant-petrel, Macronectes giganteus  (A)
 Kermadec petrel, Pterodroma neglecta
 Herald petrel, Pterodroma arminjoniana
 Murphy's petrel, Pterodroma ultima 
 Providence petrel, Pterodroma solandri
 Henderson petrel, Pterodroma atrata
 Mottled petrel, Pterodroma inexpectata
 Juan Fernandez petrel, Pterodroma externa
 White-necked petrel, Pterodroma cervicalis
 Black-winged petrel, Pterodroma nigripennis
 Cook's petrel, Pterodroma cookii
 Gould's petrel, Pterodroma leucoptera
 Collared petrel, Pterodroma brevipes (A)
 Stejneger's petrel, Pterodroma longirostris (A)
 Phoenix petrel, Pterodroma alba - vulnerable
 Blue petrel, Halobaena caerulea
 Bulwer's petrel, Bulweria bulwerii
 Tahiti petrel, Pseudobulweria rostrata
 Gray petrel, Procellaria cinerea - near-threatened
 Wedge-tailed shearwater, Ardenna pacifica
 Buller's shearwater, Ardenna bulleri (A)
 Sooty shearwater, Ardenna grisea
 Short-tailed shearwater, Ardenna tenuirostris (A)
 Christmas shearwater, Puffinus nativitatis
 Tropical shearwater, Puffinus bailloni

Frigatebirds
Order: SuliformesFamily: Fregatidae

Frigatebirds are large seabirds usually found over tropical oceans. They are large, black-and-white or completely black, with long wings and deeply forked tails. The males have coloured inflatable throat pouches. They do not swim or walk and cannot take off from a flat surface. Having the largest wingspan-to-body-weight ratio of any bird, they are essentially aerial, able to stay aloft for more than a week.

Lesser frigatebird, Fregata ariel
Great frigatebird, Fregata minor

Boobies and gannets
Order: SuliformesFamily: Sulidae

The sulids comprise the gannets and boobies. Both groups are medium to large coastal seabirds that plunge-dive for fish.

Masked booby, Sula dactylatra
Brown booby, Sula leucogaster
Red-footed booby, Sula sula

Herons, egrets, and bitterns
Order: PelecaniformesFamily: Ardeidae

The family Ardeidae contains the bitterns, herons, and egrets. Herons and egrets are medium to large wading birds with long necks and legs. Bitterns tend to be shorter necked and more wary. Members of Ardeidae fly with their necks retracted, unlike other long-necked birds such as storks, ibises and spoonbills.

Pacific reef-heron, Egretta sacra
Striated heron, Butorides striata

Kingfishers
Order: CoraciiformesFamily: Alcedinidae

Kingfishers are medium-sized birds with large heads, long, pointed bills, short legs and stubby tails.

Niau kingfisher, Todirhamphus gertrudae (E)
Mangareva kingfisher, Todirhamphus gambieri (E)
Chattering kingfisher, Todirhamphus tuta

Old World parrots
Order: PsittaciformesFamily: Psittaculidae

Characteristic features of parrots include a strong curved bill, an upright stance, strong legs, and clawed zygodactyl feet. Many parrots are vividly colored, and some are multi-colored. Old World parrots are found from Africa east across south and southeast Asia and Oceania to Australia and New Zealand.

Blue lorikeet, Vini peruviana (E)

Monarch flycatchers
Order: PasseriformesFamily: Monarchidae

The monarch flycatchers are small to medium-sized insectivorous passerines which hunt by flycatching.

 Eiao monarch, Pomarea fluxa (E)
 Nuku Hiva monarch, Pomarea nukuhivae (E)
 Iphis monarch, Pomarea iphis (E)
 Marquesas monarch, Pomarea mendozae
 Fatuhiva monarch, Pomarea whitneyi (E)

Reed warblers and allies
Order: PasseriformesFamily: Acrocephalidae

The members of this family are usually rather large for "warblers". Most are rather plain olivaceous brown above with much yellow to beige below. They are usually found in open woodland, reedbeds, or tall grass. The family occurs mostly in southern to western Eurasia and surroundings, but it also ranges far into the Pacific, with some species in Africa.

Tuamotu reed warbler, Acrocephalus atyphus (E)

White-eyes, yuhinas, and allies
Order: PasseriformesFamily: Zosteropidae

The white-eyes are small and mostly undistinguished, their plumage above being generally some dull colour like greenish-olive, but some species have a white or bright yellow throat, breast or lower parts, and several have buff flanks. As their name suggests, many species have a white ring around each eye.

 Silvereye, Zosterops lateralis (I)

Starlings
Order: PasseriformesFamily: Sturnidae

Starlings are small to medium-sized passerine birds. Their flight is strong and direct and they are very gregarious. Their preferred habitat is fairly open country. They eat insects and fruit. Plumage is typically dark with a metallic sheen.

Common myna, Acridotheres tristis (I)

Waxbills and allies
Order: PasseriformesFamily: Estrildidae

The estrildid finches are small passerine birds of the Old World tropics and Australasia. They are gregarious and often colonial seed eaters with short thick but pointed bills. They are all similar in structure and habits, but have wide variation in plumage colours and patterns.

Red-browed firetail, Neochmia temporalis (I)

See also
Lists of birds by region

References
Splitting headaches? Recent taxonomic changes affecting the British and Western Palaearctic lists - Martin Collinson, British Birds vol 99 (June 2006), 306-323

Blanvillain, C; Florent, C & V. Thenot (2002) "Land birds of Tuamotu Archipelago, Polynesia: relative abundance and changes during the 20th century with particular reference to the critically endangered Polynesian ground-dove (Gallicolumba erythroptera)". Biological Conservation 103 (2): 139-149 

Tuamotus
'Tuamotu
'